Edward Connors may refer to:

Eddie Connors, a character on Sunset Beach
Edward G. Connors, Irish-American associate of the Winter Hill Gang

See also
Edward Connor (disambiguation)